The 1990–91 St. John's Redmen basketball team represented St. John's University during the 1990–91 NCAA Division I men's basketball season. The team was coached by Lou Carnesecca in his 23rd year at the school. St. John's home games are played at Alumni Hall and Madison Square Garden and the team is a member of the Big East Conference.

Off season

Departures

Class of 1990 signees

Incoming Transfers

Roster

Schedule and results

|-
!colspan=9 style="background:#FF0000; color:#FFFFFF;"| Regular season

|-
!colspan=9 style="background:#FF0000; color:#FFFFFF;"| Big East tournament

|-
!colspan=9 style="background:#FF0000; color:#FFFFFF;"| NCAA tournament

References

St. John's Red Storm men's basketball seasons
St. John's
St. John's
St John
St John